The Alternative List, abbreviated to AL, is a socialist political party in Zürich.

The AL has existed since 1990 as a loose coalition of left-wing activists before becoming a party in 2007, with sections in the city of Zürich and the Limmat Valley. A movement in Winterthur is also associated to the party, and a section in the Horgen District was created in 2013.

The party for a time extended beyond the canton of Zürich, being also active in the cantons of Aargau from 2002 to 2006 and Schaffhausen from 2003 to 2022.

The AL works closely with the Swiss Labour Party, solidaritéS and other leftist parties and organisations. They were involved in the federal party Alternative Left with other left-wing forces from 2010 until its dissolution in 2018.

Representation
6 seats (out of 180) in the Cantonal Council of Zürich
8 seats (out of 125) in the city council of Zurich
2 seats (out of 60) in the city council of Winterthur
1 seat (out of 36) in the city council of Dietikon

Former representation 
5 seats (out of 60) in the Cantonal Council of Schaffhausen in 2012
4 seats (ouf of 36) in the city council of Schaffhausen in 2012, 2016, and 2020
1 seat (out of 5, Simon Stocker) in the city government of Schaffhausen in 2012

External links
Homepage of Alternative Liste Zurich 
Homepage of Alternative Liste Schaffhausen 
Homepage of Alternative Liste Winterthur 

Political parties in Switzerland
Socialist parties in Switzerland